The Piasecki HRP Rescuer (also called Harp) is a United States tandem-rotor transport or rescue helicopter designed by Frank Piasecki and built by Piasecki Helicopter. The Piasecki PV-3 was adopted as the HRP-1 Rescuer by the United States Navy, United States Marine Corps, and United States Coast Guard. An improved PV-17 variant was later produced as the HRP-2. As one of the first transport helicopters in military service, the HRP-1 was capable of carrying two crewmen and 8–10 passengers or 2,000 lb. (907 kg) of cargo.

Development 

The prototype helicopter (designated PV-3 by Piasecki, though commonly known to test personnel as "The Dogship") first flew at Morton, Pennsylvania in March 1945 following a development contract from the United States Navy in February 1944. The "Dogship" was a novel tandem-rotor helicopter with a fixed tricycle landing gear, powered by a 600 hp (447 kW) Pratt & Whitney R-1340-AN-1 engine. To ensure that the rotors did not hit each other, the rear end of the fuselage curved upwards so the rear rotor was higher than the forward rotor. This was based on a Drago Jovanovich patented design. The fuselage was constructed of ordinary mild steel tubing, filled out with wooden ribs, and covered with doped fabric.

Following a series of mechanical incidents with the prototype, including stripped transmission gears, it was determined that use of common automotive parts in the helicopter transmission were inadequate to the severe loads imposed by flight; subsequent prototypes built after the war used stronger components.
Two prototypes designated XHRP-1 were constructed; one was used as a static test aircraft and the other was used for development flying.

Operational history

As the first U.S. military helicopter in service with a significant transport capability, the HRP-1 was immediately put to use transporting cargo and personnel. Although referred to officially as the HRP-1, or "Harp", the helicopter's distinctive shape, with no protruding nose beyond the forward rotor's axis, soon earned it the nickname "The Flying Banana". The first HRP-1 Rescuer flew on 15 August 1947, and a second batch of 10 was built later, with the final machine delivered in 1949. All were powered by the  Pratt & Whitney R-1340-AN-1 engine.

In all, 20 HRP-1s were ordered by the United States Navy, which passed most of their order to the U.S. Marine Corps and the Coast Guard. Three additional helicopters were delivered to the U.S. Coast Guard with the designation HRP-1G. An improved PV-17 version with an all-metal skin was developed with five ordered in June 1948 as the HRP-2; all HRP-2s were delivered to the U.S. Coast Guard for use as rescue craft. Nine HRP-1s formed the backbone of the first Marine helicopter transport squadron, HMX-1, and were used in various exercises designed to test the helicopter's ability to deliver troops in beach assault or forward battlefield operations. 
 
In service, the HRP-1 frequently suffered various teething and maintenance troubles such as broken engine mounts and loose fittings; it was not unusual for the fabric covering to rip loose from the helicopter in flight, often entangling the rotor blades. Despite these issues, the relative success of Piasecki's tandem rotor design would lead to the Piasecki H-21 family of helicopters.  Two surviving aircraft are in storage at the American Helicopter Museum & Education Center in West Chester, Pennsylvania and a third is under restoration at the Classic Rotors Museum in Ramona, California.

Variants

PV-3
Prototype tandem-rotor helicopter powered by a Wright R-975 piston engine, one built.
XHRP-1
Military designation for two further PV-3s, one for static testing and one for flight trials.
HRP-1
Production variant, 20 built including three HRP-1Gs.
HRP-1G
Three United States Navy HRP-1s for the United States Coast Guard.
HRP-2
Metal skinned variant, five built.

Operators

United States Coast Guard
United States Navy
United States Marine Corps

Specifications (HRP-2)

See also

References

Notes

Bibliography

External links

Piasecki XHRP-1 page
Piasecki HRP-1 page
Piasecki HRP-2 page
"Navies Helicopter For Land or Sea Has Twin Rotors." Popular Mechanics, November 1945, p. 49.
"Navies Helicopter For Land or Sea Has Twin Rotors." Popular Mechanics, November 1945, cover art work.

Aircraft first flown in 1945
United States military helicopters
Piasecki Helicopter aircraft
Search and rescue helicopters
Single-engined piston helicopters
Tandem rotor helicopters
1940s United States helicopters
Piasecki HRP1 Rescuer